Bening is a surname. Notable people with the surname include:

Alexander Bening (died 1519), Flemish 16th century miniature painter of the Ghent-Bruges school
Levina Bening (1510–1576), Flemish Renaissance miniaturist to the English court of Henry VIII, Edward VI, Mary I and Elizabeth I

Ahmed Bening, Ghanaian youth and a social commentator
Annette Bening (born 1958), American actress
Simon Bening (1483–1561), Flemish 16th century miniature painter of the Ghent-Bruges school
Vladimir Bening (born 1954), Russian mathematician

See also
Benning (disambiguation)
Binning (disambiguation)